Parliamentary elections were held in Uruguay on 27 November 1913 to elect all members of the Chamber of Representatives.

Electoral system
Suffrage was limited to literate men. Voting was not secret, as voters had to sign their ballot paper.

Results

References

Uruguay
Parliamentary
Elections in Uruguay
Election and referendum articles with incomplete results